The thirteenth season of The Bachelorette premiered on May 22, 2017. This season featured Rachel Lindsay, a 32-year-old attorney from Dallas, Texas.

Lindsay attended the University of Texas at Austin where she graduated with a bachelor's degree in 2007 and Marquette University Law School where she graduated with a Juris Doctor in 2011. She finished in third place on season 21 of The Bachelor featuring Nick Viall. Lindsay is the first African-American in the lead role in the history of the Bachelor franchise. 

The season concluded on August 7, 2017, with Lindsay accepting a proposal from 37-year-old chiropractor Bryan Abasolo. They married on August 24, 2019, and currently live in Los Angeles, California.

Production

Casting and contestants
Casting began during season twelve of The Bachelorette. Lindsay was named as the bachelorette on February 13, 2017, during the telecast of Jimmy Kimmel Live!.

Lindsay then appeared in the live season finale of season 21 on The Bachelor, she met the first four contestants, Dean, Eric, Blake E., and DeMario.

Notable cast includes pro wrestler Kenny Layne.

Filming and development
Filming began on March 16, 2017, shortly after the conclusion of the twenty-first season of The Bachelor. Destinations for this season were South Carolina, Norway, Denmark, Switzerland and Spain, with appearances including actors Mila Kunis and Ashton Kutcher, former NBA player Kareem Abdul-Jabbar, actress and television host Ellen DeGeneres and country singer Russell Dickerson.

Contestants

The first 4 contestants were revealed in The Bachelor season finale on March 13, 2017. The full cast of 31 contestants were later revealed on May 17.

Future appearances

Bachelor in Paradise
Season 4

DeMario Jackson was set to appear in the fourth season of Bachelor in Paradise. When production restarted after the misconduct allegations had halted production, Jackson did not return for filming.  Dean Unglert joined the cast on that season after he was eliminated during hometowns. Diggy Moreland, Matt Munson, Iggy Rodriguez, Jack Stone, Jonathan Treece, Fred Johnson, Blake Elarbee, and Adam Gottschalk would also appear on season 4. When production restarted, Rodriguez was eliminated in week one. Munson quit in week two. Elarbee and Johnson were eliminated in week three. Unglert, Moreland, Stone, and Treece all quit in week four. Gottschalk left Paradise in a relationship with Raven Gates.

Season 5

Bigger and Moreland returned for the fifth season of Bachelor in Paradise. They were joined by first time returnee Kenny Layne. Layne quit in week three. Bigger quit in week five. Moreland was eliminated in week five.

Season 6

Unglert returned for the sixth season of Bachelor in Paradise. He quit during week 3 but returned in week 5. He quit, once again, that same week to pursue a relationship with Caelynn Miller-Keyes.

Season 8

Alex Bordyukov returned on the eighth season of Bachelor in Paradise. He was eliminated in week 4.

Australia Season 2

Bordyukov appeared on the second season of Bachelor in Paradise Australia. He left the show in week 7 to pursue a relationship with fellow US contestant, Caroline Lunny, who was also competing on that season. However, the pair is no longer together.

Bachelor in Paradise Canada

Bordyukov returned for the inaugural season of Bachelor in Paradise Canada. He split from Kit Blaiklock week 5.

The Bachelor Winter Games
Unglert would appear again on his third Bachelor Nation franchise appearance in The Bachelor Winter Games, he joined with first-time returnees Bigger, Jamey Kocan and Josiah Graham to compete as Team USA. Bigger and Kocan were eliminated in week one, Graham was eliminated in week three. Unglert was eliminated in week four.

Call-out order

 The contestant received the first impression rose
 The contestant received a rose during a date
 The contestant was eliminated
 The contestant was eliminated during a date
 The contestant was eliminated outside the rose ceremony
 The contestant was disqualified from the competition
 The contestant won the competition

Episodes

Notes

Controversies

Lee Garrett's racist tweets
The show came under fire for casting Lee Garrett, who had tweeted many racist comments, for their first ever black lead's season.  Garrett's tweets consisted of comparing Black Lives Matter to a terrorist group, comparing the NAACP to the Ku Klux Klan, and called feminists ugly.

References

External links

2017 American television seasons
The Bachelorette (American TV series) seasons
Television shows filmed in California
Television shows filmed in South Carolina
Television shows filmed in Norway
Television shows filmed in Denmark
Television shows filmed in Sweden
Television shows filmed in Switzerland
Television shows filmed in France
Television shows filmed in Maryland
Television shows filmed in Miami
Television shows filmed in Wisconsin
Television shows filmed in Colorado
Television shows filmed in Texas
Television shows filmed in Spain